The 2012 Winter Youth Olympics opening ceremony, was held on 13 January 2012 at Bergiselschanze, Innsbruck, Tyrol, Austria. Over 15,000 people attended the ceremony.

The parade of nations was held before the ceremony. The ceremony featured speeches about the 1964 and 1976 Games. Heinz Fischer, the President of Austria, declared the Games open before the Olympic Hymn was played and the Olympic flag was raised, which wasn't at the appropriate time. Christina Ager delivered the athletes' oath with the mistake of saying the word "scheiße", causing the audience to boo at her. The three cauldrons were lit before the 1976 Games opening ceremony, where two cauldrons were lit. The 1964 cauldron was lit by Egon Zimmermann, Franz Klammer lit the 1976 cauldron and Paul Gerstgraser lit the 2012 cauldron.

See also
 2012 Winter Youth Olympics national flag bearers

External links
 Full video of the opening ceremony

Olympics opening ceremonies
2012 Winter Youth Olympics
Ceremonies in Austria
2012 in youth sport